Duchess Agnes of Württemberg (13 October 1835 – 10 July 1886) was a German aristocrat and writer under the pseudonym of Angela Hohenstein.

Life and family
Duchess Agnes was born at Carlsruhe, Kingdom of Prussia (now Pokój, Poland) was the youngest child of Duke Eugen of Württemberg (1788–1857), (son of Duke Eugen of Württemberg, and Princess Louise of Stolberg-Gedern (1764-1834)) by his second marriage to Princess Helene of Hohenlohe-Langenburg, (daughter of Karl Ludwig, Prince of Hohenlohe-Langenburg and Countess Amalie Henriette of Solms-Baruth). Agnes had three half-siblings by her father's previous marriage with Princess Mathilde of Waldeck and Pyrmont.

Agnes founded numerous foundations and institutions that bore her name, such as the Agnes School, a school for female servants in Gera.

Marriage and issue
Agnes married on 6 February 1858 at Karlsruhe to Heinrich XIV, Prince Reuss Younger Line (1832–1913), son of Heinrich LXVII, Prince Reuss Younger Line and Princess Adelheid of Reuss-Ebersdorf.

They had two children:
Heinrich XXVII, Prince Reuss Younger Line (10 November 1858 – 21 November 1928), married in 1884 to Princess Elise of Hohenlohe-Langenburg, had issue.
Princess Elisabeth Reuss of Schleiz (27 October 1859 – 23 February 1951), married in 1887 to Prince Hermann of Solms-Braunfels, had issue.

Works
Helene (narrative, 1867)
From a lovely time. Eight images (incl.: Fra Angelico Giovanni da Fiesole, Roswitha, From Venice, a fantasy forest, three folk songs in a picture, In the back room, the lilies of the cemetery Meran, Johann Arnold's diary, 1878)
The blessing of the Grandmother (Family picture in two volumes, 1880)

Ancestry

Notes and sources
The Royal House of Stuart, London, 1969, 1971, 1976, Addington, A. C., Reference: II 223
Genealogisches Handbuch des Adels, Fürstliche Häuser, Reference: 1956
L'Allemagne dynastique, Huberty, Giraud, Magdelaine, Reference: II 525

1835 births
1886 deaths
Duchesses of Württemberg
House of Reuss
19th-century German writers
People from Namysłów County
People from the Province of Silesia